Plesiops is a genus of ray-finned fishes in the family Plesiopidae. They have elongated pelvic fins and the other fins are marked with colourful patterns such as stripes and these give name to the common names "longfin" and "prettyfin". They are thought to be nocturnal and are infrequently seen in the wild. They are carnivorous and their diet is made up of crustaceans, gastropods and small fishes and sometimes on brittle stars. A defining characteristic of this genus is that they lay elongated eggs which are laid under rocks or overhangs and are guarded by the male.

Species
The following species are currently recognised within the genus Plesiops:

 Plesiops auritus 
 Plesiops cephalotaenia 
 Plesiops coeruleolineatus 
 Plesiops corallicola 
 Plesiops facicavus 
 Plesiops genaricus 
 Plesiops gracilis 
 Plesiops insularis 
 Plesiops malalaxus 
 Plesiops multisquamata 
 Plesiops mystaxus 
 Plesiops nakaharae 
 Plesiops nigricans 
 Plesiops oxycephalus 
 Plesiops polydactylus 
 Plesiops thysanopterus 
 Plesiops verecundus

References

Plesiopinae
Taxa named by Lorenz Oken